Jerry Irwin Mander (born May 1, 1936) is an American activist and author, best known for his 1978 book, Four Arguments for the Elimination of Television.  In a more recent book, The Capitalism Papers, Mander argues against capitalism as a sustainable and viable system on which to base an economy.

Early life and education
Mander was born in the Bronx, New York City to Harry and Eva Mander, an immigrant Jewish couple who struggled to achieve success in America. In his Four Arguments he wrote:
My parents carried the immigrants' fears. Security was their primary value: all else was secondary. Both of them had escaped pogroms in Eastern Europe. My father's career had followed the path familiar to so many New York immigrants. Lower East Side. Scant schooling. Street hustling. Hard work at anything to keep life together. Early marriage. Struggling out of poverty.

Curiously, success came to him during the Depression. He founded what later became Harry Mander and Company, a small service business to the garment industry, manufacturing pipings, waist bands, pocketing and collar canvas.

One of the reasons for my father's success during hard times was World War II. He was beyond draft age and so was free to do a successful trade in servicing the manufacture of military uniforms. After the war, the business grew in new directions as the economy spurted forward into an era of rapid growth.

At an early age, Jerry Mander moved with his family from the Bronx to a semi-rural area of Yonkers, New York. He grew up there, and says: "I was a golf star throughout my youth and that was what I wanted to be, a professional golfer when I was very young."

Mander earned a B.S. in Economics from the Wharton School of the University of Pennsylvania, then an M.S. in International Economics from Columbia University's Business School.

Career
After receiving his M.S., Mander worked in advertising for 15 years, including five as partner and president of Freeman, Mander & Gossage in San Francisco. Mander worked with the noted environmentalist, David Brower, managing the Sierra Club's advertising campaigns to prevent the construction of dams in the Grand Canyon, to establish Redwood National Park, and to stop the U.S. Supersonic Transport (SST) project. In 1971, he founded the first non-profit advertising agency in the United States, Public Interest Communications.

Mander served as the executive director of the International Forum on Globalization, which he founded in 1994, until 2009 and continues on its staff as a Distinguished Fellow. He is also the program director for Megatechnology and Globalization at the Foundation for Deep Ecology.

In 2007, Jerry Mander appeared in the full-length documentary film, What a Way to Go: Life at the End of Empire.

In an interview with Nancho.net's W. David Kubiak, Mander describes how he got into advertising and how he turned it to the service of social causes:
Well, I wasn't a rebel when I got into advertising. I became a rebel through advertising. It was by being in advertising and realizing what advertising does in the system. I mean I can't explain why I, unlike other advertising men, saw that as a big problem. But I became involved using those techniques to help, you know, environmental groups and anti-war groups and civil rights groups, using advertising as a technique to help them. Advertising and also public relations work. So using that medium is what awoke me in many ways to the power of the medium and the power to use it in the reverse, against the system as well. Although the main problem is that those who are in power have so much more power and more money than those who are trying to resist it. And so we're always up against a heavy ratio, and the fact the opposite side has more power than we do.

Personal life
In 1965, Mander married feminist author Anica Vesel Mander (b. 1934, d. 2002-06-19). They had two sons, Kai Maxim Mander and Yari David Mander. Although the Manders divorced in 1982, they remained close friends for the rest of Anica's life. Jerry Mander has lived in Bolinas, California since 1977.

Works

The Great International Paper Airplane Book, with George Dippel and Howard Gossage (1971) 
Four Arguments for the Elimination of Television (1977) 
In the Absence of the Sacred: The Failure of Technology and the Survival of the Indian Nations, Sierra Club Books (1991) 
The Case Against the Global Economy and for a Turn Toward the Local, with Edward Goldsmith (1996) .
Alternatives to Economic Globalization: A Better World Is Possible, Contributor, with the International Forum on Globalization Alternatives Task Force (2004) , .
Paradigm Wars: Indigenous Peoples' Resistance to Globalization, with Victoria Tauli-Corpuz (2006) 
The Superferry Chronicles: Hawaii’s Uprising Against Militarism, Commercialism, and the Desecration of the Earth, with Koohan Paik, Koa Books (2008) 
The Capitalism Papers: Fatal Flaws of an Obsolete System (2012)

See also 
 Anarcho-primitivism
 Deep ecology

Notes

External links

 
Bad Magic: The Failure of Technology - An Interview with Jerry Mander by Catherine Ingram from The Sun magazine, November 1991
The Perils of Globalization - An Interview with Jerry Mander by Scott London (from the radio series "Insight & Outlook")
Four Arguments for the Elimination of Television - A Book Review, 1996
Privatization of Consciousness, an Article by Jerry Mander, Monthly Review, October 2012 
The Foundation for Deep Ecology , Sausalito, California

American environmentalists
Anti-globalization activists
American anti-globalization writers
American male non-fiction writers
American media critics
American non-fiction writers
Television studies
American advertising executives
Living people
1936 births
Jewish American writers
Neo-Luddites
Wharton School of the University of Pennsylvania alumni
Columbia Business School alumni
Place of birth missing (living people)